Marissa Janssens (born 9 September 1988) is a water polo player from Canada.

She was a member of the Canada women's national water polo team at the 2009 World Aquatics Championships, and at the
2011 World Aquatics Championships.

She played for Concordia University.

See also
 List of World Aquatics Championships medalists in water polo

References 

1988 births
Living people
Canadian female water polo players
Water polo players at the 2015 Pan American Games
Pan American Games competitors for Canada